Gently may refer to:

 Dirk Gently, a fictional character created by Douglas Adams
 George Gently, a fictional character created by Alan Hunter (see Inspector George Gently)
 "Gently", a song by American nu metal band Slipknot from Iowa
 Gently (album), a 1996 album by Liza Minnelli

See also
 Gentle (disambiguation)
 Gentleness